The  2020 Estonian Small Cup was the 11th season of the Estonian amateur football knockout tournament. The tournament began on 16 June 2020, and the final took place on 21 October 2020 at the Lilleküla Stadium, Tallinn. Paide Linnameeskond III were the current cup holders.

Round and game dates

First round
The league level that the team represents is indicated in brackets

Rahvaliiga RL (people's league) is a league organized by Estonian Football Association, but not part of the main league system.

Second round
The league level that the team represents is indicated in brackets

Rahvaliiga RL (people's league) is a league organized by Estonian Football Association, but not part of the main league system.

Third round
The league level that the team represents is indicated in brackets

Rahvaliiga RL (people's league) is a league organized by Estonian Football Association, but not part of the main league system.

References

2020
Small Cup